The Hofmahdjoch is a mountain pass in the Ortler Alps in South Tyrol, Italy.

See also
 List of highest paved roads in Europe
 List of mountain passes

References 
Alpenverein South Tyrol 

Mountain passes of the Alps
Mountain passes of South Tyrol
Ortler Alps
Nonsberg Group